The Philippine National Bank (PNB, Filipino/; ; Hokkien ) is one of the largest banks in the Philippines. It was established by the Philippine government on July 22, 1916, during the American Era.

The bank became the first universal bank in the Philippines in 1980 and was acquired by tycoon Lucio Tan after it was privatized by the government in 1989. After its merger with the Tan-owned Allied Bank on February 9, 2013, PNB became the fifth largest private domestic bank in the country.

To date, PNB has a total domestic footprint of 713 branches and more than 1,400 ATMs strategically located nationwide. PNB maintains its position as the Philippine bank with the most extensive international reach with more than 70 overseas branches, representative offices, remittance centers and subsidiaries across Asia, Europe, the Middle East, and North America.

History

Early years
The Philippine National Bank was established as a government-owned banking institution on July 22, 1916. Its primary mandate was to provide financial services to Philippine industry and agriculture and support the government's economic development effort. World War I, then raging in Europe, generated huge demand for the country's major exports, namely sugar, copra, coconut oil, Manila hemp and tobacco. However, not much was being done to develop the industries that produced these sought-after crops since access to credit facilities was limited. To solve this problem, Henderson Martin, vice governor of the Philippines, together with Miguel Cuaderno (who later became Central Bank governor) drafted a charter for a national bank.

On February 4, 1916, Public Act 2612 was passed by the Philippine Legislature providing for the establishment of PNB to replace the small P1 million government-owned Agricultural Bank. PNB's first head office was the Masonic Temple along Escolta, Manila, the "Wall Street of the Philippines" then, in the bustling district of Santa Cruz in Manila. An American, Henry Parker Willis, was its first president.

With PNB's establishment, Filipinos had a bank of their own. PNB was authorized to grant short and long-term loans to agriculture and industry. Filipino farmers then could avail of loans with interest between 8% to 10% per annum. PNB was also authorized to receive deposits, open foreign credits and rediscount bills.

On July 24, 1916, PNB established its first branch outside Manila in Iloilo. In 1917, PNB opened its first non-Philippine branch in New York City, United States. The following year, it established five more domestic branches and another outside the Philippines in Shanghai, China.

As the de facto central bank and national treasury
PNB has also functioned as the de facto central bank of the Philippines until 1949. It was given the special power to issue circulating notes.

PNB briefly ceased operations in January 1942 but reopened the next month under the supervision of Japanese authorities. After the Second World War, PNB reopened immediately and acquired the assets and assumed the liabilities of the banking division of the Bangko Sentral ng Pilipinas.

With the establishment of the Central Bank in 1949, PNB's role as issuer of currency notes, custodianship of bank reserves, sole depository of government funds and clearing house of the banking system ceased.

PNB investments
In 1955, it was authorized to operate as an investment bank with powers to own shares and to issue debentures. In 1963, it established the National Investment and Development Corporation to engage primarily in long-term and equity financing of business ventures.

PNB transferred to its new head office along Escolta in 1966 and launched the first on-line Electronic Data Processing System in the Far East.

Between 1967 and 1979, PNB opened offices in London, Singapore, Jakarta, Honolulu and Amsterdam, and 14 provincial branches. It also started the Dollar Remittance Program.

In 1980, PNB became the first universal bank in the country. However, it encountered difficulties in the mid-80s as a result of the economic downturn triggered by the assassination of Senator Benigno S. Aquino Jr. and in 1986 received assistance from the government.

For a while, the bank was headed by Roberto Benedicto, a classmate of President Ferdinand Marcos and the head of the sugar industry monopoly. He also owned Overseas California Bank in Los Angeles, California, along with Marcos. In 1990, Benedicto agreed to turn over ownership of that bank to the Philippine government in return for criminal racketeering and conspiracy charges against him being dropped. PNB bought the bank for $10 million and merged it into their Century Bank affiliate in Los Angeles.

Privatization

The privatization started in 1989 when 30 per cent of its shares were offered to the public and it was listed on the stock exchange.

In 1992, PNB became the first Philippine bank to reach  in assets. Later that year, privatization continued with a second public offering of its shares.

In 1995, PNB moved to its headquarters to the PNB Financial Center, Central Boulevard (now Diosdado Macapagal Boulevard), Pasay. In 1996, the Securities and Exchange Commission approved the Bank's new Articles of Incorporation and by-laws and the change in the status of PNB from a government-based to a private corporation with the control of the government reduced to 46 per cent.

21st century

In early 2000, the Lucio Tan Group became the single biggest private stockholder. In less than one year, the group pumped nearly P20 billion of fresh capital into the bank. In late 2000, when PNB suffered huge withdrawals, mainly from the government accounts, the government provided P25 billion in financial aid.

In May 2002, the Philippine government and Lucio Tan signed an agreement to swap the government's loans to shares. The accord increased the government's stake to 45 percent from 16 percent and reduced Lucio Tan's holding to 45 percent from 67 percent. Lucio Tan and the government also agreed that year to sell three-quarters of their combined stake within five years.

Also the same year, PNB hired 40-year old Lorenzo V. Tan as its youngest bank president.

In August 2005, PNB became fully privatized. The joint sale by the Philippine government and the Lucio Tan Group of the 67% stake in PNB was completed within the third quarter of 2005. The completion of sale is expected to speed up the development of PNB's franchise and operational competitiveness.

Despite being fully privatized, PNB continued to be a government depository bank until May 3, 2007.

PNB has remittance centers in the United States, Canada, England, Spain, the Netherlands, France, Germany, Austria, Italy, Hong Kong, Japan, Singapore, Malaysia and in countries in the Middle East.

PNB has also stepped up its marketing efforts to overseas Filipino workers with its PNB Global Filipino Money Card.

Complementing PNB's banking activities are its subsidiaries like PNB General Insurers, a non-life insurance company; PNB Capital, an investment bank; PNB Securities, a stock brokerage outfit; and PNB Forex, which engages in foreign exchange trading. It also has a majority stake in PNB-Japan Leasing Corp. For life insurance requirements of PNB clients, it has a substantial equity stake in Beneficial PNB Life.

Merger with Allied Banking Corporation

On December 7, 2007, the Supreme Court of the Philippines affirmed a judgment dismissing the state's sequestration of Lucio Tan's companies: "There can be no question that indeed, petitioner's (the government's) orders of sequestration are void and have no legal effect." The landmark decision would trigger a planned merger between PNB and Tan's own Allied Banking Corporation. Edgar Bancod, research head, ATR-Kim Eng Securities, stated that the merged bank would become the country's fourth biggest, after Metrobank, Banco de Oro, and Bank of the Philippine Islands.

On December 12, 2007, official statements from PNB and Allied Bank confirmed the impending merger of both banks by early 2008. In August 2009, PNB and Allied Bank were expected to complete their merger within the next six to nine months after the latter sells its 28% stake in California-based Oceanic Bank. As of July 7, 2010, the remaining stumbling block to the merger was addressed, as the latter found a buyer for its minority stake in a California-based bank. The move was seen to pave the way for the merger.

On February 9, 2013, the PNB–Allied Bank merger was completed, with Philippine National Bank as the surviving brand. The merged bank became the fourth largest private domestic bank. Tarriela became the chairman and Mier the chief executive of the merged bank. Mier was the chief executive until he retired on May 27, 2014; Mier was replaced by Reynaldo Maclang as the president and CEO. Maclang served as the president and CEO until his retirement on November 15, 2018. Jose "Wick" Veloso became the president and CEO on November 16, 2018.

Employee unions
In Japan, employees of the Tokyo branch of the PNB are represented by the union Tozen.

See also

 Allied Banking Corporation
 Department of Finance

References

Further reading
 Largest Banks in the Philippines (2009)

External links
Philippine National Bank

Banks of the Philippines
Companies listed on the Philippine Stock Exchange
Companies based in Pasay
Philippine brands
Philippine companies established in 1916
Banks established in 1916